{{DISPLAYTITLE:C16H24N2O6}}
The molecular formula C16H24N2O6 (molar mass: 340.37 g/mol, exact mass: 340.1634 u) may refer to:

 CPHPC
 Pirisudanol

Molecular formulas